Baylin, also written Bealin is a village in County Westmeath, Ireland, about  east of Athlone. Its postal address is Baylin, Athlone, County Westmeath, Ireland.

A medieval high cross stands in the eastern part of the village.

Baylin and its 'sister' village, Mount Temple, form the only two in the parish of Ballyloughloe (often referred to as Caulry or Mount Temple).

Education 
Baylin has one primary school, St. Ciaran's Primary School, which had over 180 pupils enrolled as of the 2020 school year.

References 

Towns and villages in County Westmeath